The Samudra-class Pollution Control Vessel is a class of three vessels built by the ABG Shipyard in Gujarat for Indian Coast Guard.

Design
The ships have been designed by Rolls-Royce Holdings and have the type number UT 517. The vessels are 94 meters long, with a displacement of 3300 tons and maximum draught of 4.5 meters. The vessels are designed to attain speed of 20.5 knots. They have an endurance of 6500 nautical miles at economical speed and can stay at sea for 20 days. The ships are manned by 10 officers and 100 sailors specialized in various streams.

Power and propulsion
Each vessel is fitted with two Rolls-Royce supplied Bergen B32 diesel engines, two Kamewa Ulstein propeller plants, an Ulstein Aquamaster thruster, Tenfjord steering gear, an Ulstein rudder, Rauma Brattvaag deck machinery, Ulstein automation system and switchboards and Intering anti-roll stabilization.
Its anti roll stabilization system is the first to be incorporated on a coast guard vessel built in India. Other major features of vessels are Integrated Platform Management System (IPMS) and its Dynamic Positioning System enabling the vessel to be maneuvered in restricted areas with precision.

Pollution control equipment
The equipment on board is used for containment, recovery, separation and dispersal of pollutants. High tech control systems enable simultaneous tasks to be performed by a single operator. The vessel is fitted with latest pollution control equipment including two rigid sweeping arms enabling it to contain oil spill whilst in motion. An advanced software would assist in predicting the spread of the complex oil spill pattern. The vessel is designed to recover the lightest to the most viscous oil at the rate of 300 tons per hour. The contaminated water can be pumped on board and analysed in a laboratory. The oil can then be separated and held in storage tanks of 300 tonnes capacity or 1000 tonnes in inflatable barges which can be towed behind the vessel to free up deck space. The vessel is also equipped with fire fighting and salvage systems.

Secondary role

The secondary role includes peacetime patrolling, firefighting and salvage. For maritime law enforcement, EEZ surveillance, anti smuggling, fishery protection, search & rescue and high speed interdiction it is equipped with CRN 91 Naval Gun, light helicopter, five High Speed Boats and four Water Scooters.  An Infra Red Surveillance System is also installed on-board providing additional capability for the ship's crew to detect targets in the night.  The vessels are also equipped with fire fighting and salvage systems.

Launch and Commission
The first vessel (CG 201) christened as Samudra Prahari (Ocean Striker) was launched on 20 March 2007 by Thrity R Contractor, wife of Vice Admiral RF Contractor, Director General, Indian Coast Guard. It was commissioned at Mumbai on 9 October 2010 by Mr Ashok Chavan, the Chief Minister of Maharashtra.

The second vessel (CG 202) christened as Samudra Paheredar (Ocean Guardian) was launched on 13 March 2009 by Urmila Singh, wife of Rajendra Singh, inspector general and commander of western region of Indian Coast Guard. It was commissioned at the Hazira port near Surat in Gujarat by Admiral Nirmal Verma, Chairman, Chiefs of Staff Committee and Chief of the Naval Staff on 21 July 2012.

Ships of the Class

See also
Solas Marine Fast Interceptor Boat
L&T Interceptor Class fast attack crafts
Couach fast interceptor boats
Cochin Fast Patrol Vessels
Alcock Ashdown Survey Catamaran

References

External links
http://indiancoastguard.nic.in/indiancoastguard/dgvisit/LAUNCHING%20OF%20PCV/LAUNCHING%20PCV.htm
http://netindian.in/taxonomy/gujarat/surat

Coast Guard
Patrol vessels
Indian Coast Guard
Ships of the Indian Coast Guard